Estrone sulfotransferase (EST), also known as estrogen sulfotransferase, is an enzyme that catalyzes the transformation of an unconjugated estrogen like estrone into a sulfated estrogen like estrone sulfate. It is a steroid sulfotransferase and belongs to the family of transferases, to be specific, the sulfotransferases, which transfer sulfur-containing groups. This enzyme participates in androgen and estrogen metabolism and sulfur metabolism.

Steroid sulfatase is an enzyme that catalyzes the reverse reaction, the transfer of a sulfate to an unconjugated estrogen.

Reaction
In enzymology, an EST is an enzyme that catalyzes the following chemical reaction:

3'-phosphoadenylyl sulfate + estrone  adenosine 3',5'-bisphosphate + estrone 3-sulfate

Thus, the two substrates of this enzyme are 3'-phosphoadenylyl sulfate and estrone, whereas its two products are adenosine 3',5'-bisphosphate and estrone 3-sulfate.

The enzyme also catalyzes the same reaction for estradiol, with estradiol sulfate as the product.

Types
Two enzymes have been identified that together are thought to represent estrone sulfotransferase (EST):

 SULT1A1 (catalyzes the reactions estradiol to estradiol sulfate and, to a lesser extent than SULT1E1, estrone to estrone sulfate)
 SULT1E1 (catalyzes the reactions estrone to estrone sulfate and estradiol to estradiol sulfate)

Function

Structure

Names
The systematic name of this enzyme class is 3'-phosphoadenylyl-sulfate:estrone 3-sulfotransferase. Other names in common use include 3'-phosphoadenylyl sulfate-estrone 3-sulfotransferase, estrogen sulfotransferase, estrogen sulphotransferase, oestrogen sulphotransferase, and 3'-phosphoadenylylsulfate:oestrone sulfotransferase.

See also
 Steroidogenic enzyme

References

Further reading 

 
 
 

EC 2.8.2
Enzymes of known structure